The Quebec Legislature (officially Parliament of Quebec) is the legislature of the province of Quebec, Canada. The legislature is made of two elements: the King of Canada, represented by the lieutenant governor of Quebec, and the unicameral assembly called the National Assembly of Quebec. The legislature has existed since Canadian Confederation in 1867 when Quebec, then called Canada East, became one of the founding provinces. From 1867 to 1968 the legislature was bicameral, containing a lower chamber called the Legislative Assembly of Quebec and an upper chamber called the Legislative Council of Quebec.

Like the Canadian federal government, Quebec uses a Westminster-style parliamentary government, in which members are elected to the National Assembly after general elections and from there the party with the most seats chooses a premier of Quebec and Executive Council of Quebec.  The premier is Quebec's head of government, while the King is its head of state. When the party with the most seats has fewer than half of the total number of seats, it forms a minority government, which can be voted out of power by the other parties.

Members meet in the Quebec Parliament Building in the provincial capital city of Quebec City.

References